Mohamed Saeed Ibrahim Abulkhair (born 17 January 1998), is a Qatari professional footballer who plays as a goalkeeper for Qatar Stars League side Al-Wakrah.

References

External links
 

1998 births
Living people
Qatari footballers
Association football goalkeepers
Aspire Academy (Qatar) players
Al-Wakrah SC players
Al-Markhiya SC players
Qatar Stars League players
Qatari Second Division players